National Day, also known as Independence Day, is a Sri Lankan national holiday celebrated annually on 4 February to commemorate the country’s political independence from British rule in 1948. It is celebrated all over the country through a flag-hoisting ceremony, dances, parades and performances. Usually, the main celebration takes place in Colombo, where the President raises the national flag and delivers a nationally televised speech.

Many national struggles were made in the history of Sri Lanka. And on the independence day, all of these are remembered and celebrated. But the independence movement against the British is especially recalled.

In the President's speech, he highlights the achievements of the government during the past year, raises important issues and gives a call for further development. The President also pays tribute to the national heroes of Sri Lanka, observes two minutes of silence in their memory, challenges and vows to eradicate separatism. A great military parade is also made. In recent years, it showcases the power of the Army, Navy, Air Force, Police and the Civil Defense Force. The commitment, bravery, national unity and determination to achieve peace are recollected in the minds of people, who also thank the people who fought and laid down their lives for the country.

Celebrations  
There were also singing and performances that showcase national unity and culture. Religious observances are also made in many places of worship around the country, wishing for peace and prosperity for the country, people and the tri-forces. The national media also tries to promote ideas like bravery, confidence, dedication, national unity, patriotism, nationalism, peace, national responsibility and awareness of national history in the minds of people.

Traditionally the Sri Lanka Navy accords a 21 gun salute to the nation from the ceremonial naval gun battery at the Colombo Lighthouse. A Google Doodle reaching only Sri Lanka celebrated the occasion in 2013 and from 2017 continuously onwards.

List of celebration and place

1991 - Independence Square
1992- Independence Square
1993 - Independence Square
1994 - Independence Square
1995 - Independence Square
1996 - Independence Square
1997 - Independence Square
1998 - Parliment Complex - Sri Jayawardana Pura Kotte
2008 -  Galle Face Green
2009 -  Galle Face Green
2010 -  Dalada Maligawa - Kandy
2011 -  Katharagama 
2012 -  Anuradhapura - Jayanthi St 
2013 -  Trincomalee 
2014 -  Kegalle
2015 -  Galle Face Green 
2016 -  Galle Face Green 
2017 -  Galle Face Green 
2018 -  Galle Face Green 
2019 - Galle Face Green 
2020 - Independence Square
2021 - Independence Square  
2022 - Independence Square   
2023 - Galle Face Green

See also 
 Sri Lankan independence movement

References 

1948 in international relations
1948 in politics
February observances
History of Sri Lanka (1948–present)
Sri Lanka
Public holidays in Sri Lanka
Sri Lankan independence movement
Ceremonies in Sri Lanka
Sri Lankan historical anniversaries